The 1963 Lafayette Leopards football team was an American football team that represented Lafayette College during the 1963 NCAA College Division football season. Lafayette finished last in the Middle Atlantic Conference, University Division, and last in the Middle Three Conference.

In their first year under head coach Kenneth Bunn, the Leopards compiled a 1–8 record. John Brown and Richard Zanewicz were the team captains.

In conference play, Lafayette's 1–4 record against MAC University Division opponents represented the worst winning percentage in the six-team circuit; Lehigh finished a half-game ahead in the standings with a 1–3 record. The Leopards were swept by their Middle Three rivals, losing to both Lehigh and Rutgers.

The season-ending rivalry game against Lehigh was originally slated for November 23, but postponed following the assassination of John F. Kennedy the previous day. The November 30 makeup date was the latest in the year that the 99-year traditional matchup had ever been held.

Lafayette played its home games at Fisher Field on College Hill in Easton, Pennsylvania.

Schedule

References

Lafayette
Lafayette
Lafayette Leopards football seasons
Lafayette Leopards football